David Conolly is a writer, director, comedian and actor whose production company, Mansion Pictures, produced two feature-length films, Mothers & Daughters and The Understudy,

Early life
Conolly was born in Leeds. His father, Michael, worked as a chaplain in a mental hospital. After following the family tradition and working in psychiatry, David was selected to join the National Youth Theatre of Great Britain, which in turn led to him making his West End debut at age 17. David went on to study performing arts at Leicester Polytechnic where he directed Mobil Winning New play, Woundings and won outstanding contribution to the National Student Drama Festival with Ode to St Cecilia.  Having completed his degree, David  began training as an actor at Mountview Theatre School before returning to the West End with the much acclaimed A Passionate Woman and the award-winning A Last Bus From Bradford.

Career
Between acting jobs, David and Hannah Davis met whilst running Lunacy, an alternative comedy night on the London fringe. They then worked their way up the production ladder, producing the pilot of Lunacy, which led to work in BBC Drama and Documentary. Breaking out from the TV production treadmill, they created festival nominated shorts and community films for the Red Cross, the Teenage Cancer Unit Trust and the National Schizophrenic Foundation. They also developed their writing skills with screenplays for Hartswood Films, Quentin Morrissey, Buffalo Pictures as well as working on Shakespearean productions at the Open Air Theatre, Regent’s Park, London.

Mothers & Daughters

Having spent a few years in constant development it was decided to combine their many skills and create a feature film, entitled Mothers & Daughters. Six months were spent with actors devising and rehearsing the screenplay, followed by intense bursts of filming with breaks so that cast and crew could earn money to live on during production and so that Hannah and David could earn money to finance the next phase of filming! Finally producer and writer Lynda La Plante (Prime Suspect) saw a rough-cut of Mothers & Daughters and became their post production fairy Godmother. Mothers & Daughters was invited to film festivals worldwide, debuting at Cannes then playing at São Paulo, Montreal, Quebec, Barcelona, Chicago, New York, Los Angeles, The Hamptons, London and Dinard "Great performances, good pacing, sharp script", Variety declared, they were nominated - The Golden Hitchcock Award for Direction. Mothers & Daughters was selected as one of the top six British Films of the year.

The Understudy
All of this activity led to their next project and the screenplay, Wedding Town was developed for the UK Film Council. Shortly after, principal photography began in New York City on their second full-length feature, The Understudy, which was subsequently completed in 2008. The Understudy received the Silver Lei for Excellence in Filmmaking at the Honolulu International Film Festival in 2009, The Roger Smith award from Cinemonde 2009 and the award for Best Score 2008 from the UCMF (French Composers Union). The Understudy is currently playing at film festivals around the world and is to be released later this year. They write scripts for Hannah’s father, composer Carl Davis, whom they often collaborate with. These have been performed in front of a live orchestra all over the world, from the Royal Albert Hall in London to Carnegie Hall in New York.

Stand up
As a comedian, Conolly is often seen in the Friday night show in The Main Room at The Comedy Store on Sunset Strip, Los Angeles and has appeared at Stand Up NY in New York City, Zanies in Chicago, Flappers in Burbank, The Casablanca Resort and Casino in Mesquite, The Ice House in Pasadena, The Improv in Irvine and recently competed in the World Series of Comedy in Las Vegas. David was also the MC at the World Marbles Competition.  Conolly is the host of Hindsight News, an online spoof news show.

References

External links
 http://us.vdc.imdb.de/name/nm1239373/

English male stage actors
Living people
Male actors from Leeds
Year of birth missing (living people)
English male film actors
National Youth Theatre members